Edward Morecroft (died 1580) was a Canon of Windsor from 1560 to 1580

He was educated at Brasenose College, Oxford.

He was appointed:
Prebendary of Hereford 1566
Prebendary of Heathfield 1568 - 1573

He was appointed to the first stall in St George's Chapel, Windsor Castle in 1560 and held the canonry until 1580.

Notes 

1580 deaths
Canons of Windsor
Alumni of Brasenose College, Oxford
Year of birth unknown